Normandin Lake is a freshwater body of the unorganized territory of Lac-Ashuapmushuan, Quebec, in the western part of the Regional County Municipality (MRC) Le Domaine-du-Roy, in the administrative region of Saguenay-Lac-Saint-Jean, in the province of Quebec, in Canada.

This lake is entirely located in the canton of Ventadour which is at the end
West of the MRC Le Domaine-du-Roy.

Forestry is the main economic activity of the sector. Recreational tourism activities come second.

The forest road route 212 linking Obedjiwan, Quebec and La Tuque pass south of Dubois Lake and Normandin Lake. Other secondary forest roads serve the vicinity of the lake.

The surface of Normandin Lake is usually frozen from early November to mid-May, however safe ice circulation is generally from mid-November to mid-April.

Geography

Toponymy
In 1900, this toponym is indicated on the Map of a road leading to the Lake
Saint John to James Bay by the rivers Chamouchouan, Nottaway, Rupert
explored in 1897-98-99 by Henry O'Sullivan, Land Survey Inspector
province of Quebec. The name of the lake evokes the work of the life of the surveyor Joseph-Laurent Normandin. The latter had traveled the region of Saguenay-Lac-Saint-Jean in 1732 to draw a detailed map of the place by locating the lakes, large and small, and to fix the boundaries of the Domaine du Roi.

Normandin also wrote a journal entitled Journal de voyage that Joseph-Laurent Normandin had made in the King's domain in Canada from the Chicoutimi post office to the height of the land in 1732. During his exploration in 1732, Joseph- Laurent Normandin had designated Lake Normandin under the name "Lac Patchitachekaosakajgane", meaning lake of the height of land.

The toponym "Lake Normandin" was formalized on December 5, 1968, by the Commission de toponymie du Québec, i.e. at the creation of this commission.

Notes and references

See also 

Lakes of Saguenay–Lac-Saint-Jean
Le Domaine-du-Roy Regional County Municipality